The 2023 BWF season is the overall badminton circuit organized by the Badminton World Federation (BWF) for the 2023 badminton season. The world badminton tournament in 2023 consists of:
1. BWF tournaments (Grade 1; Major Events)
 BWF World Mixed Team Championships (Sudirman Cup)
 BWF World Championships

2. BWF World Tour (Grade 2)
 Level 1 (BWF World Tour Finals)
 Level 2 (BWF World Tour Super 1000)
 Level 3 (BWF World Tour Super 750)
 Level 4 (BWF World Tour Super 500)
 Level 5 (BWF World Tour Super 300)
 Level 6 (BWF Tour Super 100)

3. Continental Circuit (Grade 3) BWF Open Tournaments: BWF International Challenge, BWF International Series, and BWF Future Series.

The Sudirman Cup is mixed teams event. The others – Super 1000, Super 750, Super 500, Super 300, Super 100, International Challenge, International Series, and Future Series are all individual tournaments. The higher the level of tournament, the larger the prize money and the more ranking points available.

The 2023 BWF season calendar comprises these six levels of BWF tournaments.

Schedule 
This is the complete schedule of events on the 2023 calendar, with the champions and runners-up documented.
Key

January

February

March

April

May

June

July

August

September

October

November

December

Retirements 
Following is a list of notable players (winners of the main tour title, and/or part of the BWF Rankings top 100 for at least one week) who announced their retirement from professional badminton, during the 2023 season:
  Mychelle Crhystine Bandaso (born 1 May 1998 in Tarakan, East Kalimantan, Indonesia) reached a career-high ranking of no. 27 in mixed doubles on 9 August 2022. She won her first BWF World Tour title at the 2019 Russian Open Super 100 event in mixed doubles with her partner Adnan Maulana. She also won a bronze medal in the individual event at the 2021 Southeast Asian Games. According to former badminton player Debby Susanto, Bandaso retired due to an unspecified medical condition. The 2022 Indonesia Masters was her last tournament.

References

External links
 Badminton World Federation (BWF) at bwfbadminton.com

season
Badminton World Federation seasons
season